The Pan American Gymnastics Championships were first held in 1997.

Three medals are awarded: gold for first place, silver for second place, and bronze for third place.

Medalists

Medal table

References 

 

Gymnastics at the Pan American Championships medalists